The 1915–16 Georgia Bulldogs basketball team represents the University of Georgia during the 1915–16 college men's basketball season. The team captain of the 1915–16 season was C.W. Rawson.

Schedule

|-

References

Georgia Bulldogs basketball seasons
Georgia
Bulldogs
Bulldogs